Robert Michael Henry Cottam (born 16 October 1944) is a former English cricketer who played in four Test matches from 1969 to 1972. Cottam was a right-handed batsman, who bowled right-arm fast-medium. The cricket writer, Colin Bateman, noted that "Cottam's ability to bowl sharp seamers or cutters at a reduced pace on turning wickets made him a useful tourist, and his four England caps came on two tours of the Indian subcontinentthen retired to live in Dartmouth Devon ".

Life and career
After attending school in Wembley, Cottam began his career at Hampshire in 1963 and used his height, stamina and accuracy to good effect with the new ball.  He took 100 wickets in a season on three occasions and took 9 for 25 against Lancashire in 1965.  Although ideally suited to English conditions, his only Test caps came on tours of the subcontinent, to Pakistan and Ceylon under Colin Cowdrey in 1968–9, and India and Pakistan in 1972–3 under Tony Lewis.  It was a testament to his skill that he took 14 wickets at 23.35 in his four tests, and he was unlucky to miss out on home selection. He switched counties to Northants in 1971, his style of bowling evolving to concentrate on remorseless accuracy, and continued to be a prolific wicket taker.  He took over a 1,000 first-class wickets in all, at an average of 20.91.  Although skilled with the ball, he was a confirmed tailender with the bat, recording just one half century in 289 first-class matches.

He turned to coaching after retiring from the playing arena, appointed as Warwickshire's manager and then Somerset's director of cricket, before being picked by David Lloyd to serve as England's bowling coach between 1998 and 2001.  He also played minor county cricket for Devon.  His son, Andy Cottam, played first-class cricket for Derbyshire and Somerset.

References

External links
 

1944 births
Living people
England Test cricketers
English cricketers
Hampshire cricketers
Northamptonshire cricketers
People from Cleethorpes
Cricketers from Wembley
Devon cricketers
Marylebone Cricket Club cricketers
English cricket coaches
T. N. Pearce's XI cricketers
Marylebone Cricket Club President's XI cricketers
Marylebone Cricket Club Touring Team cricketers